Sharul Nizam (born 2 June 1997) is a Singaporean footballer who plays as a forward.

Career statistics

Club

Notes

References

1997 births
Living people
Singaporean footballers
Association football forwards
Singapore Premier League players
Balestier Khalsa FC players
Warriors FC players
Young Lions FC players
Albirex Niigata Singapore FC players